Busan Metro Line 4 is a rubber-tyred metro line of the Busan Metro network that connects part of Gijang-gun, Busan, and upper Haeundae-gu, Busan, into Dongnae-gu, Busan Korea. It is operated by the Busan Transportation Corporation. Opened on 30 March 2011, the line is a rapid transit (metro) system consisting of 14 stations - 8 underground, 1 on-ground, and 5 above-ground. The line color is blue. A trip through the entire line takes about 24 minutes. Unlike lines 1 to 3 of Busan Metro, the trains are driverless and run with pneumatic tires on concrete track (Roll way) between two guide bars.

Lines 3 and 4
While Busan Metro Line 3 was being planned, the planners thought about making what is now Busan Metro Line 4 the 2nd phase of Busan Metro Line 3. However, for several reasons, they have made this 2nd phase into a new line called Busan Subway Line 4.

Archaeology
Compared to Line 3, Line 4 took quite a long time for its construction. There are many reasons for this; however the most significant one is that there were many artifacts found in the construction site of the line, including those from the time of the Three Kingdoms of Korea and the Joseon Dynasty. These artifacts had great historical value, so they caused the completion date of the line to be delayed from its original date of opening in 2008. Some of these artifacts are being displayed inside a historical museum dedicated to this in Suan Station (the museum opened on 28 January 2011).

Rolling stock
Woojin Industrial System Company Limited, supplied urban rubber tire trains for Line 4.

List of stations

See also
 Busan Metro
 Transportation in South Korea

References

External links

 Introduction of Busan Metro Line 4 (Korean text)

4
Railway lines opened in 2011
Light rail in South Korea